Bristol-Washington Township School, also known as Bristol High School, is a historic school building located at Bristol, Elkhart County, Indiana. The original section was built in 1903–1904, with additions made in 1923, 1925, and 1949.  The original building is a two-story, Colonial Revival style brick and limestone building on a raised basement.  The original building measures 61 feet by 61 feet. The building houses the Elkhart County Historical Museum.

It was added to the National Register of Historic Places in 1991.

The building now serves as the Elkhart Historical Museum, which was founded in 1968 as a partnership between the Elkhart Historical Society and the Elkhart County Parks Department. The museum is home to 30,000 artifacts and serves approximately 10,000 patrons a year.

References

External links

Elkhart County Historical Museum

History museums in Indiana
School buildings on the National Register of Historic Places in Indiana
Colonial Revival architecture in Indiana
School buildings completed in 1904
Buildings and structures in Elkhart County, Indiana
National Register of Historic Places in Elkhart County, Indiana
Museums in Elkhart County, Indiana
1904 establishments in Indiana